In information security, de-perimeterisation is the removal of a boundary between an organisation and the outside world. De-perimeterisation is protecting an organization's systems and data on multiple levels by using a mixture of encryption, secure computer protocols, secure computer systems and data-level authentication, rather than the reliance of an organization on its network boundary to the Internet. Successful implementation of a de-perimeterised strategy within an organization implies that the perimeter, or outer security boundary, was removed.

Metaphorically, de-perimeterisation is similar to the historic dismantling of city walls to allow the free flow of goods and information. To achieve this there was a shift from city states to nation states and the creation of standing armies, so that city boundaries were extended to surround multiple cities.

De-perimeterisation was coined by Jon Measham, a former employee of the UK's Royal Mail in a 2001 research paper, and subsequently used by the Jericho Forum of which the Royal Mail was a founding member.

Potential benefits 
Claims made for removal of this border include the freeing up of business-to-business transactions, the reduction in cost and the ability for a company to be more agile. Taken to its furthest extent an organisation could operate securely directly on the Internet.

Operating without a hardened border frees organizations to collaborate, utilizing solutions based on a Collaboration Oriented Architecture framework.

Relevance to other computing areas 
The work, particularly by the Jericho Forum, on de-perimeterisation has fed into two key areas of computing:
 Originally described as "computing outside your perimeter", this is now referred to as Cloud Computing.
 The Zero trust security model is the architectural response to the problem statement posed by de-perimeterisation.

Variations 
More recently the term is being used in the context of a result of both entropy and the deliberate activities of individuals within organizations to usurp perimeters often for well intentioned reasons. The Jericho Forum paper named "Collaboration Oriented Architecture" refers to this trend of de-perimeterisation as a problem:
Problem
The traditional electronic boundary between a corporate (or ‘private’) network and the
Internet is breaking down in the trend which we have called de-perimeterisation.
 
Variations of the term have been used to describe aspects of de-perimeterisation such as:
 "You’ve already been de-perimeterised" to describe the Internet worms and viruses which are designed to by-pass the border using web and e-mail.
 "re-perimeterisation" to describe the interim step of moving perimeters to protection groups of computer servers or a data centre – rather than the perimeter.
 "Macro-Perimeterisation" the act of moving the security perimeter into "the cloud", see Security As A Service, examples of such security services in the cloud are exemplified by email cleaning services or proxy filtering services provided by towers in the internet.
 "micro-perimeterisation" moving the security perimeter to surround the data itself, interim steps might include moving the perimeter around individual computer systems or an individual application (consisting of a cluster of computers).

Notes

References 

Data security